The Saya de Malha luminous roughy (Aulotrachichthys sajademalensis) is a species of slimehead that is native to Saya de Malha in the Indian Ocean, the Kyushu–Palau Ridge in the Pacific Ocean, and the Nazareth Banks in the Mediterranean.

References

External links
 

Aulotrachichthys
Taxa named by Aleksandr Nicholaevich Kotlyar
Fish described in 1979
Fish of the Indian Ocean
Fish of the Pacific Ocean